Walter Piston's Capriccio for Harp and String Orchestra, was commissioned in 1963 by Broadcast Music Incorporated on the occasion of its twentieth anniversary, and is dedicated to the harpist Nicanor Zabaleta, who premiered it in Madrid on October 19, 1964.

The work is in one movement and lasts for approximately 10 minutes.

References

Compositions by Walter Piston
Piston
1963 compositions
Compositions for string orchestra